Josephine Baker (1906–1975) was an American-born French entertainer and activist.

Josephine Baker may also refer to:
Sara Josephine Baker, (1873–1945), American physician 
Josephine Baker (1854–1918), American actress and wife of John Drew Jr.